Potvin is a surname. Notable people with the surname include:

Bryan Potvin, Canadian singer-songwriter and guitarist and band member of The Northern Pikes
Denis Potvin (born 1953), former defenceman and team captain for the New York Islanders in the National Hockey League
Félix Potvin (born 1971), retired National Hockey League goaltender
Jean Potvin (born 1949), retired Canadian professional ice hockey defenceman
Kevin Potvin (born 1962), newspaper publisher and columnist, small business owner, and politician based in Vancouver, British Columbia
Liza Potvin, Canadian novelist
Marc Potvin (1967–2006), Canadian professional ice hockey player in the National Hockey League
Roxanne Potvin (born 1982), bilingual Gatineau, Quebec-based singer, blues guitarist, songwriter and vocalist